Xiaohe (little river) may refer to the following locations in China:

Xiaohe Cemetery, bronze-age burial site in Xinjiang
Xiaohe District (小河区), former district of Guiyang, Guizhou
Xiaohe, Liuyang (小河乡), Hunan
Xiaohe, Shitai County, Anhui
Xiaohe, Xun County, Henan
Xiaohe, Wanquan in Wanquan, Honghu, Jingzhou, Hubei